Between 2008-09 and 2014-15 the Iranian football club S.C. Damash Gilan alternated between the Persian Gulf Pro League (formerly Iran Pro League or IPL) - the highest tier of Iranian football - and the Azadegan League. It was demoted in 2009, promoted in 2011, and again demoted in 2014. The team also competed each year in the Hazfi Cup.

Seasons

Key

P = Played
W = Games won
D = Games drawn
L = Games lost
F = Goals for
A = Goals against
Pts = Points
Pos = Final position

IPL = Iran Pro League
D/1 = Azadegan League

References
Iran Premier League Stats
RSSSF database about Iranian league football.

 
Damash